Phil Howlett (born 16 January 1975) is a Tonga-born Australia-raised former professional rugby league footballer who played in the 1990s and 2000s.

Background
Howlett was born in Tonga.

While attending John Paul II College in 1993, Howlett played schoolboy representative rugby league for Australia.

He is the brother of All Black Doug Howlett.

Playing career
Howlett played first grade premiership football for the Penrith Panthers, Parramatta Eels and South Sydney Rabbitohs in Australia before joining the Bradford Bulls in the Super League.

Representative career
Howlett played for the Tonga national rugby league team at the 1995 and 2000 World Cups.

During the Super League war Howlett played for the Australian Rugby League's "Rest of the World" side.

References

External links
World Cup 1995 details

1975 births
Living people
Australian sportspeople of Tongan descent
Bradford Bulls players
Catalans Dragons players
Parramatta Eels players
Penrith Panthers players
Rugby league centres
Rugby league five-eighths
South Sydney Rabbitohs players
Tonga national rugby league team players
Tongan rugby league players